Dasht-e Dideh Ban (also Romanized as Dasht-e Dīdeh Bān) is a village in Mashayekh Rural District, Doshman Ziari District, Mamasani County, Fars Province, Iran. At the 2006 census, its population was 137, in 28 families.

References 

Populated places in Mamasani County